Miguel "Míchel" Zabaco Tomé (born 6 February 1989) is a Spanish footballer who plays for Burgos CF as a central defender.

Club career
Born in Burgos, Castile and León, Míchel graduated with Atlético Madrid's youth setup, and made his debuts as a senior with the C-team in the 2008–09 campaign, in Tercera División. In the 2010 summer he was promoted to the reserves in Segunda División B.

On 31 July 2012 Míchel joined another reserve team, UD Almería B in the third division. On 8 June 2014 he renewed with the Andalusians for three years, being promoted to the main squad at the start of the 2015–16 season.

Míchel was also named captain of the B-side in the 2014 summer, after the departure of Cristóbal to Gimnàstic de Tarragona. On 9 September 2015 – already included in the first team – he made his professional debut, starting and being sent off in a 3–3 Copa del Rey home draw against Elche CF (4–3 win on penalties).

Míchel made his Segunda División debut on 1 November 2015, starting as a left back in a 1–1 home draw against Real Valladolid. On 30 January of the following year, after appearing sparingly, he was loaned to Cultural y Deportiva Leonesa in the third tier, until June.

On 12 July 2016, Míchel signed for FC Cartagena in the third division. He continued to appear in the category in the following years, representing SD Ponferradina, UD Logroñés and Burgos CF, achieving promotion to the second level with all of them.

References

External links

1989 births
Living people
Sportspeople from Burgos
Spanish footballers
Footballers from Castile and León
Association football defenders
Segunda División players
Segunda División B players
Tercera División players
Atlético Madrid C players
Atlético Madrid B players
UD Almería B players
UD Almería players
Cultural Leonesa footballers
FC Cartagena footballers
SD Ponferradina players
UD Logroñés players
Burgos CF footballers